Park Hee-jin (born April 12, 1979 in Gwangju) is a South Korean freestyle skier, specializing in halfpipe.

Park competed at the 2014 Winter Olympics for South Korea. She placed 21st in the qualifying round in the halfpipe, failing to advance.

Park made her World Cup debut in March 2013. As of April 2014, her best World Cup finish is 19th, at Sierra Nevada in 2012–13. Her best World Cup overall finish in halfpipe is 36th, in 2013–14.

References

1979 births
Living people
Olympic freestyle skiers of South Korea
Freestyle skiers at the 2014 Winter Olympics
Sportspeople from Gwangju
South Korean female freestyle skiers